Hungary competed at the 2019 World Aquatics Championships in Gwangju, South Korea from 12 to 28 July.

Medalists

Artistic swimming

Hungary's artistic swimming team consisted of 12 athletes (12 female).

Women

 Legend: (R) = Reserve Athlete

Open water swimming

Hungary qualified three male and three female open water swimmers.

Men

Women

Mixed

Swimming

Hungary's swimming team consisted of 24 athletes (15 male and 9 female).

Men

Women

Mixed

 Legend: (*) = Swimmers who participated in the heats only.

Water polo

Men's tournament

Team roster

Viktor Nagy
Dániel Angyal
Bence Bátori
Balázs Hárai
Szilárd Jansik
Tamás Mezei
Krisztián Manhercz
Zoltán Pohl
Tamás Sedlmayer
Dénes Varga (C)
Márton Vámos
Gergő Zalánki
Soma Vogel
Coach: Tamás Märcz

Group C

Quarterfinals

Semifinals

Third place game

Women's tournament

Team roster

Edina Gangl
Dóra Csabai
Gréta Gurisatti
Anikó Gyöngyössy
Brigitta Horváth
Anna Illés
Rita Keszthelyi (C)
Dóra Leimeter
Alda Magyari
Natasa Rybanska
Rebecca Parkes
Dorottya Szilágyi
Vanda Vályi
Coach: Attila Bíró

Group B

Playoffs

Quarterfinals

Semifinals

Bronze Medal match

References

World Aquatics Championships
2019
Nations at the 2019 World Aquatics Championships